William Tanner may refer to:

People 
 William Tanner (politician) (1851–1938), New Zealand politician
 William G. Tanner (1930–2007), American academic and Southern Baptist pastor
 Dooee Tanner (William Henry Tanner, 1871–1938), Australian rugby union player
 William Tanner (cricketer) (1841–?), English cricketer
William Elam Tanner (1836 - 1898), Lieutenant Colonel, politician, and businessman

Fictional people 
 Bill Tanner, character in the James Bond franchise
 Dr. Bill Tanner, a villain from the Alex Rider novel Snakehead
 Willie Tanner, husband and father of the Tanner family in the TV series ALF